Danny Cowley (born 22 October 1978) is an English professional football coach who was most recently manager of EFL League One side Portsmouth. 

He has previously managed Concord Rangers, Braintree Town, Lincoln City, Huddersfield Town and Portsmouth.  He played at a semi-professional level as a midfielder.

Early life
Cowley was born in Havering, London. He was involved with the youth set-up with Wimbledon from the under-10s to under-16s but was not offered a scholarship having suffered from Osgood–Schlatter disease.

Playing career
Playing as a midfielder he also spent time with non-League clubs, including Barking, Romford, AFC Hornchurch and Brentwood Town, before his career was ended by injury in 2007. Shortly after that, he was offered the assistant manager's job at Concord Rangers.

Managerial career

Concord Rangers
When he took over at Concord Rangers (first as assistant and then as joint manager with Danny Scopes), the club was playing in the Essex Senior Football League, in front of crowds of around 50 people. In his first season the club was promoted to the Isthmian League Division One North, and narrowly missed out on a second successive promotion the following year, before being promoted a year later. After two seasons of consolidation, Cowley won his third promotion with the club, this time to the National League South. In his last season in charge, Concord reached the first round proper of the FA Cup, while narrowly missing out on a play-off spot.

Braintree Town
On 30 April 2015, Cowley became manager of Braintree Town. That season Braintree secured their highest-ever finish of third place in the National League, and qualified for the play-offs. In the play-off semi-finals, they won the first leg at Grimsby Town, defeating them 1–0, before losing the second leg 2–0 at home, failing to qualify for the final as his side lost 2–1 on aggregate.

Lincoln City
After just one season in charge of Braintree Town, Cowley moved on again, this time to Lincoln City on 13 May 2016. During Cowley's first season in charge of Lincoln, he oversaw the club's promotion back to the Football League – doing so by winning the National League title with two games to spare. 

In the same season Lincoln became the first non-league club to reach the quarter-final of the FA Cup in over a century, knocking out Championship sides Ipswich Town and Brighton & Hove Albion, followed by Premier League side Burnley, in the process. Lincoln eventually lost 5–0 to Arsenal in the quarter-finals.
In April 2018, with their contracts due to end in 2021, Cowley and his brother signed contract extensions lasting until 2022. On 8 April 2018, he led his team to the EFL Trophy final against Shrewsbury Town at Wembley Stadium which they won 1–0 owing to a goal by Elliott Whitehouse. It was Lincoln's first ever game at Wembley.

In Lincoln's first season back in the league (2017–18) they finished the season seventh in League Two qualifying for the play-offs, where they were soundly beaten by Exeter City in the semi-final.  

The following season, Cowley guided Lincoln to promotion to League One, returning to the third tier of English football for the first time since 1999. On 22 April 2019, Cowley led Lincoln as champions to League One after a 0–0 draw at home to Tranmere Rovers.

Huddersfield Town
On 9 September 2019, Cowley left Lincoln to become the new Huddersfield Town manager. He and his assistant Nicky signed three-year contracts. After a successful run of six games unbeaten throughout the month, Cowley won the EFL Championship Manager of the Month award for October 2019. On 17 July 2020, Huddersfield defeated promotion-seeking West Bromwich Albion to all but ensure the club's Championship survival. Despite this, Cowley was sacked two days later, with chairman Phil Hodgkinson outlining the need for a "different vision" going forward as the reason for relieving Cowley of the role.

Portsmouth
On 19 March 2021, Danny Cowley was appointed as head coach of Portsmouth on a contract until the end of the 2020–21 season, with his brother Nicky once again joining as his assistant. In his first game in charge at the club, Portsmouth would come from behind to beat Ipswich Town 2–1. On 11 May 2021, after overseeing 6 wins in 12 matches in charge, Cowley signed a new "long term" deal with the club. Cowley won the EFL League One Manager of the Month award for November 2021 after winning thirteen points from five matches.

Cowley started the 2022–23 season in style, winning the League One Manager of the Month award for August 2022 after picking up thirteen points from a possible fifteen that saw Portsmouth in early contention for an automatic promotion spot. This strong start to the season fell away and following a run of over two months without a league victory, Cowley was sacked on 2 January 2023, with his side sitting in 12th position.

Personal life
Growing up, Cowley was a West Ham United supporter. During his spells as manager of Concord Rangers and Braintree Town, Cowley combined his management role with teaching Physical Education at FitzWimarc School in Rayleigh, Essex. Cowley has a brother, Nicky, who played alongside him at Romford and has been his assistant manager at Concord Rangers, Braintree Town, Lincoln City, Huddersfield Town and Portsmouth.

Cowley graduated from the University of Greenwich in 2002, obtaining a bachelor's degree in Physical Education.

Managerial statistics

Honours

As a manager
Lincoln City
League Two: 2018–19
EFL Trophy: 2017–18
National League: 2016–17

Individual
EFL Championship Manager of the Month: October 2019
EFL League One Manager of the Month: November 2021,  August 2022 
EFL League Two Manager of the Month: December 2017, August 2018
LMA League Two Manager of the Year: 2019
National League Manager of the Month: October 2016
National League Manager of the Season: 2016–17

References

External links

1978 births
Living people
Footballers from the London Borough of Havering
English footballers
Association football midfielders
Wimbledon F.C. players
Dagenham & Redbridge F.C. players
Thurrock F.C. players
Barking F.C. players
Boreham Wood F.C. players
Romford F.C. players
Hornchurch F.C. players
Brentwood Town F.C. players
Concord Rangers F.C. players
English football managers
Concord Rangers F.C. managers
Lincoln City F.C. managers
Braintree Town F.C. managers
National League (English football) managers
English Football League managers
Schoolteachers from Essex
Alumni of the University of Greenwich
Huddersfield Town A.F.C. managers
Portsmouth F.C. managers
Essex Senior Football League players